Siegfried Wolf (5 January 1926 – 16 July 2017) was a German footballer. He played in 17 matches for the East Germany national football team from 1955 to 1959.

References

1926 births
2017 deaths
East German footballers
East Germany international footballers
Place of birth missing
Association footballers not categorized by position
People from Erzgebirgskreis